Apple Valley is an incorporated town in the Victor Valley of San Bernardino County, in the U.S. state of California. It was incorporated on November 14, 1988, and is one of the 22 incorporated municipalities in California that use "town" in their names instead of "city". Its population was 75,791 at the 2020.

Apple Valley is governed by a town council. The mayor changes each December.

Apple Valley was home to Roy Rogers and Dale Evans, whose museum was first established in Apple Valley (in 1967) before the museum was relocated to Victorville in 1976. In 2003, the museum moved again, to Branson, Missouri. The move was made in hopes of reaching more fans; however, the museum closed for financial reasons on December 12, 2009.

History
For centuries, Apple Valley was populated by Shoshonean, Paiute, Vanyume, Chemehuevi, and Serrano who were attracted to the water and vegetation around the Mojave River. The Mojave people came later and were the tribal group encountered in 1542 by a detachment of Coronado's men. These were the first Spanish to come to the Mojave desert.

Pedro Fages came through the area in 1772, looking for deserters. Father Francisco Garcés spent time in the area in 1776. He was on good terms with local tribes. He killed one of his mules to feed a group of starving Vanyumes. Garcés established a trail across the Mojave to the Colorado River passing through the Apple Valley area.

The area was explored by various Spanish gold seekers in the 18th and 19th centuries. Jedediah Smith established the Old Spanish Trail through the southern Mojave and Cajon Pass. Smith was in the area in 1826 and again in 1827.

Throughout the 19th century, Apple Valley became a thoroughfare of people traveling to Southern California for various reasons. Ute horse thieves, led by Chief Walkara, brought through an estimated 100,000 horses from their raids on the Lugo Rancho and San Gabriel Mission.

In 1848, members of the Mormon Battalion, mustered out of the U.S. Army after constructing the first wagon road across the southwest to San Diego and up to Los Angeles, brought 135 mules and the first wagon through the Cajon Pass up through the Mojave River Valley on the way to the Salt Lake Valley. Battalion leader Jefferson Hunt and a crew of cowboys followed the trail with the first cattle drive from Southern California to hungry members of the Church of Jesus Christ of Latter-day Saints in present-day Utah. Hunt led a Latter-day Saint group of settlers to the San Bernardino Valley in 1851.

In 1885, the railroad came northward through the Cajon Pass and established a train stop, calling it Victor (Victorville) on the Mojave River in the area then known as Mormon Crossing. John Brown helped build some of the first roads through Apple Valley, opening up freight and stagecoach travel from the mining camps at Gold Mountain and Holcomb Valley to the railroad. In the 1860s, LaFayette Mecham built the wagon road, a short-cut across the desert, now known as Stoddard Wells Road. Over the next few decades, Victorville boomed as the commercial center of the area with gold refineries, quarries, and dance halls and saloons, while Apple Valley remained more pastoral with ranches and apple orchards.

The Apple Valley name was officially recognized when a post office was established in 1949.

One well-known apple orchard was owned by Max Ihmsen, publisher of the Los Angeles Examiner newspaper. In 1915, he developed  of apples and pears. The fame of Apple Valley spread as Ihmsen's fruit won many agricultural awards. In the late 1930s, Ihmsen's son-in-law, Cal Godshall, took over the business operations and made the ranch famous as the birthplace of California college rodeo with the first intercollegiate rodeo competition held in the United States.

Apple farming in the area started to decline about the time Ihmsen Ranch fruit production was at its prime. Water rates shot up with a switch to electric pumps. World War I took owners and workers away with the draft. During the Great Depression, many families left the mostly agricultural area looking for work. Washington and British Columbia apple growers had lower prices because they shipped their produce by river transportation, whereas Apple Valley apples were transported by rail or by truck. A series of outbreaks of a virulent fungal infection coupled with frost, heat, and hail in 1944, 1945, and 1946 ended commercial production.

A small orchard was maintained on the grounds of the Apple Valley Inn until it closed in 1986.

Geography 
Apple Valley is located at the southern edge of the Mojave Desert. Apple Valley, along with Victorville, Hesperia, Adelanto, and immediate surrounding areas, are commonly known as the Victor Valley. The primary thoroughfare through Apple Valley is State Route 18, which was given the moniker "Happy Trails Highway" within Apple Valley town limits, after the theme song of Roy Rogers and Dale Evans, who once resided on Outer Highway 18. The commercial area is split currently between State Route 18 and Bear Valley Road (the two roads are near parallel until they intersect in the east, outside of town). The Mojave River that borders the west side of Apple Valley flows south-to-north. The town is bounded on its southern edge by the foothills of the San Bernardino Mountains.

The elevation of Apple Valley is about 2,900 ft (880 m) above sea level.

Climate

According to the Köppen climate classification, Apple Valley has a semiarid climate (BSk). The city features cool winters and very hot, dry summers. Seasonal high winds occur occasionally in spring and fall.
 On average, the warmest month is July.
 On average, the coolest month is December.
 The most precipitation typically occurs in February.

Demographics

2010
At the 2010 census, Apple Valley had a population of 69,135. The racial makeup of Apple Valley was 47,762 (69.1%) White (55.5% non-Hispanic White), 6,321 (9.1%) African American, 779 (1.1%) Native American, 2,020 (2.9%) Asian, 294 (0.4%) Pacific Islander, 8,345 (12.1%) from other races, and 3,614 (5.2%) from two or more races. Hispanic or Latino of any race were 20,156 persons (29.2%).

The census reported that 68,674 people (99.3% of the population) lived in households, 161 (0.2%) lived in noninstitutionalized group quarters, and 300 (0.4%) were institutionalized.

Of the 23,598 households, 9,169 (38.9%) had children under the age of 18 living in them, 12,647 (53.6%) were opposite-sex married couples living together, 3,550 (15.0%) had a female householder with no husband present, and 1,513 (6.4%) had a male householder with no wife present.  The city had 1,582 (6.7%) unmarried opposite-sex partnerships and 177 (0.8%) same-sex married couples or partnerships; 4,743 households (20.1%) were one person and 2,429 (10.3%) had someone living alone who was 65 or older. The average household size was 2.91, with 17,710 families (75.0% of households); the average family size was 3.32.

The age distribution was 19,306 people (27.9%) under 18, 6,494 people (9.4%) 18 to 24, 15,068 people (21.8%)  25 to 44, 17,602 people (25.5%) 45 to 64, and 10,665 people (15.4%) who were 65 or older. The median age was 37.0 years. For every 100 females, there were 96.0 males.  For every 100 females age 18 and over, there were 91.0 males.

The 26,117 housing units averaged 355.2 per square mile; of the occupied units, 16,297 (69.1%) were owner-occupied and 7,301 (30.9%) were rented. The homeowner vacancy rate was 4.0%; the rental vacancy rate was 10.0%, and 45,483 people (65.8% of the population) lived in owner-occupied housing units and 23,191 people (33.5%) lived in rental housing units.

During 2009–2013, Apple Valley had a median household income of $48,432, with 20.2% of the population living below the federal poverty line.

2000
At the 2000 census, 54,239 people, 18,557 households, and 14,363 families resided in the town. The 20,163 housing units averaged 275.0 per square mile (106.2/km). The racial makeup of the town was 76.4% White, 7.9% African American, 1.0% Native American, 2.2% Asian, 0.2% Pacific Islander, 7.9% from other races, and 4.4% from two or more races. Hispanics or Latinos of any race were 18.6%.

Of the 18,557 households, 38.8% had children under the age of 18 living with them, 57.8% were married couples living together, 14.2% had a female householder with no husband present, and 22.6% were not families. About 18.0% of households were one person, and 8.4% were one person aged 65 or older.  The average household size was 2.90 and the average family size was 3.27.

The age distribution was 31.6% under 18, 7.8% from 18 to 24, 25.2% from 25 to 44, 21.7% from 45 to 64, and 13.7% 65 or older.  The median age was 35 years. For every 100 females, there were 93.8 males.  For every 100 females age 18 and over, there were 89.7 males.

The median household income was $40,421 and the median family income was $45,070. Males had a median income of $41,144 versus $30,249 for females. The per capita income for the town was $17,830.  About 13.3% of families and 17.3% of the population were below the poverty line, including 24.6% of those under age 18 and 5.6% of those age 65 or over.

Economy

Top employers
According to Apple Valley's 2020 Comprehensive Annual Financial Report, the town's largest employers are:

Infrastructure

Public safety
Law enforcement is provided by the San Bernardino County Sheriff's Department. Fire, rescue, and paramedic services are provided by the Apple Valley Fire Protection District. American Medical Response provides patient transportation via paramedic/EMT ambulances.

Cemeteries
The Sunset Hills Memorial Park and Mortuary was opened in 1995 on Waalew Road.  Dale Evans and Roy Rogers are buried there.

Utilities
The town council started the process to take over  the private water system in 2016.

Government

In the United States House of Representatives, Apple Valley is in California's 23rd Congressional District, represented by Republican Jay Obernolte.

Education
Apple Valley Unified School District operates two comprehensive high schools (9–12) five TK–8 schools, and five  TK–6 schools. One charter school offers transitional kindergarten to grade 12, and one private school offers preschool to grade 12.

High schools (9–12) 
 Apple Valley High School 
 Granite Hills High School
 High Desert Premier Academy (9–12)

Middle schools (K–8) 
Mariana Academy
Phoenix Academy
Sandia Academy
Sitting Bull Academy—Recognized as a California Distinguished School
 Vanguard Preparatory—earned the "Schools to Watch" designation

Elementary schools (K–6) 
 Desert Knolls Elementary
 Rancho Verde Elementary—Recognized as a California Distinguished School
 Rio Vista Elementary - received the CSBA Golden Bell Award
 Sycamore Rocks Elementary—is a National Blue Ribbon School
 Yucca Loma Elementary—received the CSBA Golden Bell Award
Charter Schools
 Academy for Academic Excellence - also known as "Lewis Center for Educational Research" (K–12)

Private schools 
 Apple Valley Christian Academy (Pre–12)

Notable people

 Pearl Bailey, singer-actress, and her husband, Louie Bellson, lived in Apple Valley for nearly a decade.
 Earl W. Bascom, inventor, artist, sculptor, actor, Rodeo Hall of fame inductee, "Father of Modern Rodeo"
 Newton T. Bass, Reserve Oil and Gas Co. executive, developer of Apple Valley Ranchos
Chayce Beckham, singer, winner of American Idol (season 19)
 Louie Bellson, jazz drummer/VP of Remo, lived in Apple Valley for nearly a decade with wife, Pearl Bailey.
 Chris Blais, off-road motorcycle rider
 Angel Blue, soprano opera singer
 Victor Buono, actor, lived and died in Apple Valley.
 Billy Casper, professional golfer
 Jeff Chandler, actor, Broken Arrow, first Jewish man to purchase land in Apple Valley despite CC&R restrictions
 Van Conner, musician from rock band Screaming Trees
 Marty Dodson, singer-songwriter/producer, was born in Apple Valley.
 Dock Ellis, MLB pitcher, was hospitalized at St. Mary's Hospital just prior to his death.
 Don Ferrarese, former MLB pitcher, owner of Apple Valley Land Company
 Cuba Gooding Jr., Oscar-winning actor, attended Apple Valley High School.
 Dan Henderson, mixed martial artist and Olympic wrestler
 John W. Henry, owner of Boston Red Sox, lived in Apple Valley during high school and college.
 "Mad" Mike Hughes, daredevil and amateur-crewed rocketry enthusiast
 Miko Hughes, actor, Pet Sematary, Kindergarten Cop, Apollo 13
 Will James, artist, writer who lived on C Bar G Ranch
 Herb Jeffries, actor and jazz singer, filmed several movies in Apple Valley at Murray's Dude Ranch.
 Dave Lombardo, drummer for heavy metal band, Slayer
 Joe Louis, boxing champion, was a frequent vacationer to Murray's Dude Ranch in 1930s.
 Joseph C. McConnell, top-scoring American jet ace, lived in Apple Valley until his death in an F-86H-1-NA crash.
 Lloyd Mangrum, professional golfer and 1946 U.S. Open champion
 Joseph Medina, BGen USMC, first Marine to command Navy Flotilla and Hispanic icon, Apple Valley HS graduate 
 Richard Nixon, former U.S. president, spent three months at the home of founder Newton T. Bass in 1961 writing his first book, Six Crises
 Erik Robertson, football player
 Roy Rogers and Dale Evans, western singers, actors, co-founders of Sons of the Pioneers, lived in Apple Valley from 1965 until their deaths
 Smokey Rogers, western swing musician, singer, songwriter, entertainer, local KAVR radio personality
 Chris Smith, MLB player for Oakland Athletics
 Tim Spencer, western singer, actor, co-founder of Sons of the Pioneers
 Scout Taylor-Compton, actress in Rob Zombie's Halloween
 John Charles Thomas, opera singer, KAVR radio personality
 Jason Thompson, former MLB first baseman
 Lee Van Cleef, actor, The Good, the Bad, and the Ugly
 Jason Vargas (born 1983), pitcher for the Philadelphia Phillies
 Skip Young, actor, The Adventures of Ozzie and Harriet

In popular culture 
Apple Valley has a long and storied relationship with Hollywood production studios, and has been a filming location for many award-winning feature films, TV shows/movies, and commercials:

Feature films
 The Bronze Buckaroo (1939), starring Herb Jeffries, was filmed at Murray's Dude Ranch.
 Column South (1953), starring Audie Murphy, was filmed in Apple Valley and nearby Victorville.
 Divorce Invitation (2012)
 Eagle Eye (2008), starring Shia LaBeouf
 Four Guns To The Border (1954), starring Rory Calhoun and Walter Brennan
 Foxfire (1955), starring Jane Russell, was filmed at Apple Valley Inn.
 The Hard Ride (1971) was filmed at Oro Grande Wash and in nearby Lucerne Valley.
 Harlem on the Prairie (1937), starring Herb Jeffries, was filmed at Murray's Dude Ranch.
 Harlem Rides the Range (1939), starring Herb Jeffries, was filmed at Murray's Dude Ranch.
 Highway Dragnet (1954), written by Roger Corman, starring Richard Conte and Joan Bennett, was filmed at Apple Valley Inn.
 The Hills Have Eyes (1977), was filmed in Apple Valley and nearby Victorville.
 Ordinary People (1980), winner of four Oscars, starring Mary Tyler Moore, golf scenes were filmed in Apple Valley.
 There's Always Tomorrow (1956), starring Barbara Stanwyck and Fred MacMurray, was filmed at Apple Valley Inn.
 Two-Gun Man From Harlem (1938), was filmed at Murray's Dude Ranch.

Television

 Sky King, was filmed at the old Apple Valley Airport (old airport location coordinates: 34.528°N 117.215°W)
 Perry Mason episode, "The Case of the Roving River" (1961), was filmed at Apple Valley Inn and Newton Bass House.
 Weekend of Terror (1970 ABC Movie of the Week), starring Robert Conrad, Carol Lynley. and Lee Majors, was filmed in Apple Valley.
Commercials
 GoDaddy.com, featuring Danica Patrick

See also

Victorville Precision Bombing
Victorville Army Airfield auxiliary fields

References

External links 
 
 Apple Valley Unified School District
 The Daily Press
 Apple Valley Fire Protection District

Cities in San Bernardino County, California
Populated places in the Mojave Desert
Victor Valley
Populated places established in 1988
1988 establishments in California
Incorporated cities and towns in California